Maria Amalia, Duchess of Parma (Maria Amalia Josepha Johanna Antonia; 26 February 1746 – 18 June 1804) was Duchess of Parma, Piacenza and Guastalla by marriage to Ferdinand, Duke of Parma. She was born an Archduchess of Austria as the daughter of Empress Maria Theresa and Emperor Francis I.

Childhood

Maria Amalia was born on 26 February 1746, in Vienna, Austria. She was the eighth child of Empress Maria Theresa and Emperor Francis I. Born at the Hofburg Imperial Palace, she was raised in the Habsburg Viennese court in the winter and at Schönbrunn and Laxenburg in the summer. Like her siblings, she was regularly interviewed by her mother. Maria Amalia was mainly raised to be an ideal consort, as her sisters had been, and was taught arts and how to be obedient, dutiful and representative. Because of her age and the fact that the siblings were raised separated by gender, she was in practice raised as an only child. She did not have a good relationship with her mother: in fact, of all her daughters, Maria Theresa was said to have the worst relationship with Amalia. When she debuted as an adult in the society life in Vienna, she was a success because of her beauty.

One of her paintings, St. Therese and the child Jesus, still exists today in a private collection.

Marriage

Against her will, Amalia was married to Ferdinand of Parma (1751–1802). The marriage was supported by the future Holy Roman Emperor Joseph II, whose first beloved wife had been Ferdinand's sister, Princess Isabella of Parma. The Archduchess's marriage to the Duke of Parma was part of a complicated series of contracts that married off Maria Theresa's daughters to the King of Naples and Sicily and the Dauphin of France. All three sons-in-law were members of the House of Bourbon.

Maria Amalia had fallen in love with Prince Charles of Zweibrücken, and she openly expressed her wish to marry him, in the same manner as her sister Maria Christina had been permitted to marry for love. Maria Theresa, however, forbade this and forced her to enter an arranged marriage. This caused a permanent conflict between the Empress and Maria Amalia, who never forgave her mother.

Duchess of Parma

Maria Amalia left Austria on 1 July 1769, accompanied by her brother, Joseph II, and married Ferdinand on 19 July, at the Ducal Palace of Colorno.

The Duchy of Parma was by this time ruled more or less as a French puppet state by minister Guillaume du Tillot. Du Tillot kept Ferdinand out of politics, and was favored by the maternal grandfather of Duke Ferdinand, Louis XV of France. A letter of Louis XV to his grandson dated May 1769 attests to this, wherein he counseled his grandson not to despise the minister who served his parents well; moreover, the French King said that there was no one to replace him. The marriage had been arranged by Austria and Spain to end the pro-French policy in Parma and replace it with an Austrian and Spanish one. Upon her arrival, Maria Amalia was expected to submit to the wishes of Du Tillot, who regarded her with suspicion, which immediately caused conflict.

In 1771, two years after her arrival in Parma, Maria Amalia secured the dismissal of Du Tillot and replaced him with a Spanish appointee, Jose del Llano, who was highly recommended by the paternal uncle of Ferdinand, Charles III of Spain. In 1772, the year after, Maria Amalia fired Jose del Llano and replaced him with an Italian prime minister and a cabinet of native Parmesans loyal to her rather than a foreign ruler. As Ferdinand was of a passive nature and content with occupying himself with his religious duties and raising his children, he left the affairs of state entirely to her, and after the cabinet change, Maria Amalia was therefore the ruler of Parma.

After her dismissal of Jose del Llano in 1772, Maria Amalia secured that Parma would not become a Spanish puppet state. In 1773, her mother Empress Maria Theresa appointed count Franz Xaver Wolfgang of Orsini-Rosenberg (1723-1796), her ambassador in Parma with the task to act as Maria Amalia's adviser. Maria Amalia, however, freed Parma also from Austrian influence as she had from French and Spanish, by telling Rosenberg that she did no longer wish to receive letters from Vienna - nor from Madrid. After this, the diplomatic ties with Austria and Spain were cut.

As the ruler of Parma, Maria Amalia was referred to by the public as La Signora and La Mata. She defended the independence of the Duchy of Parma from France, Spain and Austria, strengthened its inner sense of nationality, supported art, culture and literature and worked efficiently with her ministerial cabinet. Ferdinand did not have political influence, and she openly changed and contradicted his orders and had him sign official state documents for her, including her name in his orders as if they were co-rulers.

From the beginning of her stay in Parma, Maria Amalia caused a scandal with her personal lifestyle. She strongly disliked the match, and made no effort to conceal her displeasure with it or with her new circumstances in Parma. She used the economic funds from her mother for her wardrobe, a grand court and parties; she replaced most of her ladies-in-waiting with an entourage of Royal Guards composed of handsome young men, cross-dressed as a male, spent her nights unaccompanied incognito on the streets, gambled her money on the officers' club and, while Ferdinand took mistresses among the peasantry, she herself enjoyed affairs with members of his guard. Her personal life was a cause of worry for her mother, who regarded it as a stain on the position of her sister Marie Antoinette in France that Maria Amalia had become a topic of gossip and scandal in all Europe, and in 1773, it had also been the task of her ambassador Rosenberg to tell her this.

She never managed to establish a good relationship with Ferdinand, who was of a very dissimilar character to her, although they were both described as loving parents. She was greatly disliked by the Parmesan nobility, who described her as a shameful Messalina who tried to live a life of Imperial Austrian luxury not befitting such a small state, and she disliked them for not being truly useful or benefiting the interests of Parma. She was, however, popular among the public, and known for her great and genuine generosity toward the poor: at her famous gala parties at the Colorno, for example, she had tables set up for both noble and poor guests alike, enjoying the same meals.

Amalia would remain largely estranged from her mother, except for a brief reconciliation in 1773 when her son was born, despite the latter's repeated efforts at reconciliation. The duchess resisted her mother's efforts to control her from afar. When her sister Archduchess Maria Christina, Duchess of Teschen, known to the family as Marie or Mimi, visited Parma in 1775, she reported to their mother that Amalia lost much of her beauty and glamour and was also less gay and discriminating. Maria Theresa commissioned a portrait of her grandchildren in Parma by Johann Zoffany.   
Maria Amalia was in touch with her sisters, Marie Antoinette, Queen of France and Maria Carolina, the Queen of Naples for most of their married lives. The three sisters exchanged letters, portraits and gifts. In fact, one of Marie Antoinette's last letters during her imprisonment was secretly written to her sister Maria Amalia. However, since her mother distanced herself from her, she was and remained more or less ostracized from her siblings.

In 1778, her son Louis injured himself by banging his head into a marble table while playing with his sister. He recovered from a serious concussion but after this, he suffered from epileptic seizures and was often confused. This crisis contributed to a somewhat improved relationship between Maria Amalia and Ferdinand, as they were both described as loving parents and united in their interest in the children: during the 1780s, Ferdinand also took a bit more interest in state affairs, and the welfare of Parma became another common interest which managed to make their relationship more cordial.

Later life

In May 1796, during the French invasion of Italy under General Napoleon Bonaparte, the Duchy of Parma was invaded by French troops. Against the opposition of Maria Amalia, who detested the French after the execution of her sister Marie Antoinette, Ferdinand was ambivalent because of him being half French, and had declared the Duchy neutral against her will, but the neutrality was not respected by the French. Napoleon offered to refrain from conquering the Duchy if they agreed to let troops pass. After having received no reply, he offered Ferdinand the island of Sardinia in exchange for Parma. After being refused, he had French troops occupy Parma under General Cervoni and forced Ferdinand to agree to terms dictated by the French.  Though Ferdinand and Maria Amalia were formally allowed to keep their titles, they were kept under French guard, the Duchy was ruled by French representatives and used for taxes to finance the French army.

By the Treaty of Luneville in February 1801, the Duchy of Parma was declared to be annexed to a newly founded French puppet state, the Kingdom of Etruria, which was granted to the son of Amalia, who was married to an Infanta of Spain, Napoleon's ally. Both Ferdinand and Amalia opposed the treaty, and it was therefore understood, that the Duchy would not be annexed until after the death of Ferdinand.  The new French governor of Parma, Andoche Junot, placed Ferdinand and Maria Amalia under house arrest, and Amalia reportedly feared for Ferdinand's life.  
  
On 9 October 1802, Maria Amalia was appointed head of the Regency Council in Parma by the dying Ferdinand. Her official reign, however, lasted only for a short time. On 22 October 1802 the French under Napoleon I annexed the Duchy and expelled her from Parma. Ferdinand was reported to have been poisoned; there were rumors claiming that Amalia poisoned him to win back her former de facto power, but also that he had been poisoned by the spies of Napoleon, who wished to annex Parma to Etruria.

Maria Amalia participated in the funeral procession the French allowed for Ferdinand alongside her daughters. She was given permission by her nephew, the Emperor, to establish her residence in Prague Castle in Prague, together with her two surviving youngest daughters—Maria Antonia and Maria Carlotta—and a small retinue of servants, where she died in 1804. Her body was interred at the royal crypt of the St. Vitus Cathedral in Prague while her heart was taken to Vienna and placed inside an urn (number 33) at the family's Herzgruft (heart crypt).

Issue 
Maria Amalia and her husband Ferdinand had nine children:

Ancestry

Notes

References

 
 
 Friedrich Weissensteiner: Die Töchter Maria Theresias. Bastei-Verlag Gustav Lübbe, Bergisch Gladbach 1996, ISBN 3-218-00591-4.

External links

1746 births
1804 deaths
18th-century Austrian people
19th-century Austrian people
18th-century Austrian women
19th-century Austrian women
House of Habsburg-Lorraine
House of Bourbon-Parma
Austrian princesses
Princesses of Bourbon-Parma
Duchesses of Parma
Daughters of emperors
Children of Maria Theresa
Burials at St. Vitus Cathedral
Daughters of kings